Uwe Kropinski (born February 20, 1952 is a German jazz guitarist.

Born in Berlin, Kropinski studied jazz and classic guitar at Hochschule für Musik "Hanns Eisler", Berlin from 1973 to 1976, during which time he became influenced by Conny Bauer.

Kropinski first travelled to the US to play with David Friesen in 1988. Since then, he has also played with people like Volker Schlott, John Stowell, Cecil McBee and Pheeroan Aklaff.

Since 1989 Kropinski has played special guitars with 39 frets made by the guitar maker from the Netherlands Theo Scharpach.

Discography
 Solo (Amiga, 1985)
 So Oder So (ITM, 1987)
 Dancing with the Bass (ITM, 1989)
 By the Way with Dieter Köhnlein (Aho, 1989)
 Departure with David Friesen (Global Pacific, 1990)
 Berlin Concert Live (ITM, 1991)
 Guitar Guitar (ITM, 1991)
 First Time in Manhattan with Cecil McBee and Pheeroan Aklaff (ITM, 1993)
 In und um C with Dieter Köhnlein  (ITM, 1996)
 Dinner for Two with Volker Schlott (Acoustic Music, 1994)
 African Notebook with Michael Heupel (Aho, 1996)
 Faces (ITM, 1997)
 Picture in Black and White with John Stowell (Acoustic Music, 1997)
 Made in Berlin with David Friesen  (ITM, 1999)
 Stringed Together with Dieter Köhnlein (ITM, 2002)
 Made in Istanbul with David Friesen (ITM, 2004)
 American Dream (Acoustic Music, 2005)
 Sentimental Moods with Michael Heupel (ITM, 2005)
 Universal Language (Self-released, 2006)
 Made with Friends with David Friesen (Jazzwerkstatt, 2007)
 Hey Joe Hey Uwe with Joe Sachse (Jazzwerkstatt, 2008)
  Zwei with Jamaaladeen Tacuma (Jazzwerkstatt, 2009)
gallery born (Kunstraum Heiddorf, 2015)

References

External links
 Official site

German jazz guitarists
German male guitarists
1952 births
Living people
German male jazz musicians